The Priory and Parish Church of Saint Mary is in Beddgelert, in the Snowdonia area of Gwynedd, Wales. It is a Grade II* listed building, on the site of one of the oldest Christian establishments in Wales. An early Christian community was established there in the 6th century AD which is mentioned by Gerald of Wales. An Augustinian priory was founded there in the 13th century and in the Middle Ages it grew substantially thanks to the support of important Welsh nobles including Prince Llewelyn.

The priory and many of its records were destroyed in 1283 or 1284 by a fire. As of the early 16th century it was Sir John Wynn (ancestor of the Barons Newborough who owned the priory in addition to Bardsey Island. In the 16th century, as part of the dissolution of the monasteries, the priory was closed in October 1535 and became a simple parish church. Remnants of the church's medieval past include transept arches and some of the stonework around the lancet windows. The Victorian era brought further modifications including the demolition of the north aisle and some new stained glass. The existing glass is dated only to the 19th and 20th centuries and includes work by Dunstan Powell (1920) and Trena Cox (1968).

People
The harpist and wrestler Marged ferch Ifan (1696-1793) was baptised here in 1696 and married in 1717.

References

External links

Grade II* listed churches in Gwynedd